The China Railway Museum is a Chinese museum preserving locomotives that have operated on the railways of the People's Republic of China. The museum offers a total exhibition space of 16500m² and 8 exhibition tracks.

The museum is located in Chaoyang District of Beijing City, some 15 km northeast of downtown Beijing, inside the circular test track that is part of the China National Railway Test Centre. It also has a branch in downtown Beijing, in the former Zhengyangmen East Railway Station near Tian'anmen Square.

Downtown branch

The Beijing Railway Museum was opened in 2008  in a building which includes the clock-tower of the former Zhengyangmen East Railway Station of the Jingfeng Railway, just southeast of the Tian'anmen Square. The rest of the building is entirely new-build, dating from the 1979 construction of Beijing Subway Line 4, which required the rest of the old station to be demolished. The historic facade was then reconstructed, in mirror-image, on the opposite (right hand) side of the clock tower. In October 2010, Beijing Railway Museum was renamed to the Zhengyangmen Branch of the China Railway Museum. This part of the museum contains only one full size historic locomotive - an 0-6-0 tank engine from the 19th century. The rest of the displays comprise models, maps (some in 3D relief), photographs, documents and displays about the development of railways in China, including architectural models of six new stations on the CRH China Railway High-speed system. Also on display is a CRH3 cab simulator.

Gallery

See also 
 List of museums in China
Ministry of Railways of the People's Republic of China

External links 

Official website

Buildings and structures in Chaoyang District, Beijing
Museums in Beijing
Railway museums in China
2002 establishments in China